The 1948 Tour de Suisse was the 12th edition of the Tour de Suisse cycle race and was held from 12 June to 19 June 1948. The race started and finished in Zürich. The race was won by Ferdinand Kübler.

General classification

References

1948
Tour de Suisse